Francisca Pleguezuelos Aguilar (born 28 June 1950 in Granada) was a Spanish politician and Member of the European Parliament for the Spanish Socialist Workers' Party, part of the Party of European Socialists. 

She began her political career in 1989 when she was elected to the Spanish parliament representing Seville serving until 1993 and then from 2000 to 2004.

References

1950 births
Living people
Members of the 4th Congress of Deputies (Spain)
Members of the 7th Congress of Deputies (Spain)
Spanish Socialist Workers' Party MEPs
MEPs for Spain 2004–2009
21st-century women MEPs for Spain
20th-century Spanish women politicians